The federal investigations into Jack Abramoff and his political and business dealings are among the broadest and most extensive in American political history, involving well over a dozen offices of the FBI and over 100 FBI agents tasked exclusively to the investigation.  Given the extent and complexity of the suspected corruption, an entire inter-governmental task force, involving many federal government departments and agencies, has been established to aid the federal investigation.  The U.S. Justice Department has announced that it will not reveal the details of the investigation, or who specifically has been targeted for investigation until indictments are issued. Under his plea agreements, Abramoff is required to answer all questions by federal investigators and prosecutors.

The investigations led to several plea agreements by those involved, including Congressman Bob Ney (R-OH). Abramoff himself also pleaded guilty to federal corruption charges, including tax fraud and bribing public officials.  Abramoff's activities also became an issue for many Democratic candidates in the November 2006 House and Senate elections, as many challengers painted the incumbent Republican Congress as corrupted by Abramoff and his powerful allies. On March 29, 2006, he was sentenced to five years and ten months in prison and ordered to pay restitution of more than $21 million.

As a result of Abramoff's criminal behavior, prominent politicians with close ties to Abramoff as well as hundreds of Congressional politicians who have received money from his clients (see the monetary influence of Jack Abramoff) came under media scrutiny (with some even donating the money to charity), with lobbying reform proposals presented by both parties. In September 2006 both the Senate and House passed bills and rules changes to make public earmarks but not make other substantive lobbying reforms.

List of alleged scandals
Jack Abramoff Indian lobbying scandal
 Abramoff was under investigation by federal grand juries for his involvement in the multimillion-dollar defrauding of Native American tribes who were his lobbying clients, and related bribery of public officials. On January 3, 2006, Abramoff pled guilty to three felony counts: conspiracy, fraud, and tax evasion (Abramoff owes the Internal Revenue Service $1.7 million for that charge). In addition, Abramoff and other defendants must make restitution of at least $25 million USD that was defrauded from clients, most notably the Native American tribes. Abramoff's guilty plea was part of a plea deal that requires him to cooperate in the ongoing investigation of his role in congressional corruption.

The agreement alleges that Abramoff bribed public officials, including a person identified as "Representative #1," confirmed to be Bob Ney, a Republican congressman from Ohio. Also included: the hiring of congressional staffers and conspiring with them to lobby their former employers; including members of Congress in violation of a one-year federal ban on such lobbying. Ney has established a legal defense fund for himself to defend against possible charges related to Abramoff.  On January 15, 2006, Ney relinquished his post as Chairman of the House Administration Committee. On May 8, 2006, Ney's former Chief of Staff, Neil Volz pleaded guilty to one count of conspiracy, including wire fraud and violating House rules.  On June 20, 2006, White House procurement official David Safavian, a long-time colleague of Abramoff and Grover Norquist, was convicted of lying and obstruction for concealing his efforts at the GSA to aid Abramoff.

Jack Abramoff Guam investigation
 Abramoff was under investigation by a grand jury in Guam over an alleged plot to control the functions of the courts in that territory, until the prosecutor was removed from office by the Bush administration.
SunCruz Casinos investigation
Abramoff was indicted on August 11, 2005, by a grand jury in Fort Lauderdale, Florida, for bank fraud arising from the purchase of SunCruz Casinos. On January 4, 2006, Abramoff pled guilty to conspiring to commit wire fraud and mail fraud, and of a separate charge of wire fraud.
Team Abramoff 
Enumerates Abramoffs staff who were formerly employed by US Congressman.
Other scandals
Abramoff made multiple payments to Doug Bandow, former Senior Fellow at the Cato Institute, and at least one other think tank expert, Peter Ferrara, to write opinion pieces favorable to his clients.

Abramoff was involved in a scandal to influence the United States Department of Interior to prevent the Jena Band of Choctaw Indian Tribe from building a Casino that would take away money from one of Abramoff's tribal clients.  Abramoff paid money to the Council of Republicans for Environmental Advocacy (CREA), in exchange for help from CREA president Italia Federici in persuading Deputy Secretary for the U.S. Department of Interior J. Steven Griles to block the Jena Band's Casino application.

In 2002 Abramoff was a registered lobbyist for the General Council for Islamic Banks, for which he was paid $20,000. Saleh Abdullah Kamel, the chairman of this Council, was investigated for allegedly funding terrorism and terrorists including Osama Bin Laden.

Notes and references

External links
 Plea Agreement of January 3, defrauding of American Indian tribes and corruption of public officials, US District Court of District of Columbia.
 Plea Agreement of January 4, conspiracy and wire fraud, US Southern District Court of Florida.